War of the Ring is a strategy board game by Roberto Di Meglio, Marco Maggi and Francesco Nepitello, first produced by Nexus Editrice (Italy) and currently published by Ares Games.

Since its first print-run it has been produced in many languages: Fantasy Flight Games published the English edition in 2004. An expansion called Battles of the Third Age was released in 2006 and a Collector's Edition in 2010 (with both the base game and expansion materials, hand-painted miniatures, a leather-bound rulebook, and corrected and clarified rules and cards). The Fantasy Flight edition of both the base game and expansion are currently out of print. A new 2nd Edition, published by Ares Games, was published in 2011, as well as one expansion entitled Lords of Middle Earth and one called Warriors of Middle Earth.

Previous edition
In 1976, SPI was granted a license by Tolkien Enterprises to produce wargames based on Lord of the Rings. War of the Ring was the first licensed product to attempt to cover the entire series of conflicts depicted in Lord of the Rings from the Fellowship's departure from Rivendell to the final battle at the Black Gates of Mordor. It is a two-player game, with one player taking the side of the Free Peoples of Middle-earth, and the other player taking the dark forces of Sauron. There are also rules for a three-player version, with one player taking the role of Saruman. The Dark Power also has the option of winning a military victory, played out by moving Nazgûl to various important Fellowship-controlled fortresses and rolling dice see if they are captured.

Gameplay
War of the Ring is a 2-player game that takes approximately 3 hours, though there are variant rules for 3 or 4 players where one or both sides play as a team. The game concerns the War of the Ring starting from the Fellowship's forming in Rivendell. One player controls the Shadow Peoples and tries to conquer Middle-earth or to corrupt the Fellowship's Ringbearer. The other player controls the Free Peoples and tries to hold back the Shadow long enough to move the Fellowship into Mount Doom and destroy the Ring. A Free Peoples military victory is also possible, but the Shadow's power is overwhelming.

The board depicts northwestern Middle-earth, divided into territories. Some lands form nations while broad swatches sit unclaimed. The Free Peoples are the nations of Gondor and Rohan, the Elves (Rivendell, Lórien, the Woodland Realm, and the Gray Havens), the Dwarves (the settlements in Erebor, the Iron Hills and the Blue Mountains) and "The North" (the men of Dale, Carrock, and Bree, and the hobbits of the Shire). The Shadow Peoples are Sauron (Mordor, Moria, Angmar and Dol Guldur), Isengard, and the combined Southrons and Easterlings.

References

External links
Official War of the Ring Forums
 (Ares Games version)
 (Nexus Editrice/Fantasy Flight Games version)
 (Nexus Editrice version)
Site of one of the War of the Ring playtesters, with an extensive FAQ and useful articles

Asymmetric board games
Board games based on Middle-earth
Board games introduced in 2004
Fantasy board wargames
Fantasy Flight Games games